The 1980 Atlanta Falcons season was the Falcons 15th season and culminated in their first division title in franchise history. After a 3-3 start, the Falcons went on a nine-game winning streak as Quarterback Steve Bartkowski passed for a career-best 3,544 yards while connecting on 31 Touchdown passes. As the NFC's top seed, the Falcons gained home-field advantage throughout the playoffs. The Falcons season ended with a 30-27 divisional playoff loss to the Dallas Cowboys before 60,022 fans at Fulton County Stadium. Atlanta had leads of both 24-10 and 27-17 before falling to Danny White's TD pass to Drew Pearson in the final minute.

Offseason

Draft

Personnel

Staff

Roster

Regular season

Schedule

Note: Intra-division opponents are in bold text.

Game summaries

Week 1

Week 2

Week 3

Week 4

Week 5

Week 6

Week 7

Week 8

Week 9

Week 10

Week 11

Week 12

Week 13

Week 14

Week 15

Week 16

Playoffs

Divisional

Standings

References

External links
 1980 Atlanta Falcons at Pro-Football-Reference.com

Atlanta
Atlanta Falcons seasons
NFC West championship seasons
Atlanta Falcons